In mathematics, a character group is the group of representations of a group by  complex-valued functions. These functions can be thought of as one-dimensional matrix representations and so are special cases of the group characters that arise in the related context of character theory. Whenever a group is represented by matrices, the function defined by the trace of the matrices is called a character; however, these traces do not in general form a group. Some important properties of these one-dimensional characters apply to characters in general:
 Characters are invariant on conjugacy classes.
 The characters of irreducible representations are orthogonal.
The primary importance of the character group for finite abelian groups is in number theory, where it is used to construct Dirichlet characters.  The character group of the cyclic group also appears in the theory of the discrete Fourier transform. For locally compact abelian groups, the character group (with an assumption of continuity) is central to Fourier analysis.

Preliminaries

Let  be an abelian group.

If  is a character of a finite group , then each function value  is a root of unity, since for each  there exists  such that , and hence .

Each character f is a constant on conjugacy classes of G, that is, f(hgh−1) = f(g).  For this reason, a character is sometimes called a class function.

A finite abelian group of order n has exactly n distinct characters. These are denoted by f1, ..., fn. It is called the principal character of G; the others are called the non-principal characters.

Definition 
If G is an abelian group, then the set of characters fk forms an abelian group under pointwise multiplication. If  is finite of order n, then  is also of order n. In this case, since  for all , the inverse of a character is equal to the complex conjugate.

Alternative definition 
There is another definition of character grouppg 29 which uses  as the target instead of just . This is useful while studying complex tori because the character group of the lattice in a complex torus  is canonically isomorphic to the dual torus via the Appell-Humbert theorem. That is,We can express explicit elements in the character group as follows: recall that elements in  can be expressed asfor . Note thatgiving us the desired factorization. Since  for any abelian group , we haveafter composing with the complex exponential, we find thatwhich is the expected result.

Examples

Finitely generated abelian groups 
Since every finitely generated abelian group is isomorphic tothe character group can be easily computed in all finitely generated cases.

Orthogonality of characters 
Consider the  matrix A = A(G) whose matrix elements are  where  is the kth element of G. 

The sum of the entries in the jth row of A is given by
 if , and
.

The sum of the entries in the kth column of A is given by
 if , and
.

Let  denote the conjugate transpose of A.  Then 
.
This implies the desired orthogonality relationship for the characters: i.e.,

 ,

See also 

 Pontryagin duality

References

 See chapter 6 of 

Number theory
Group theory
Representation theory of groups